Acid salts are a class of salts that produce an acidic solution after being dissolved in a solvent. Its formation as a substance has a greater electrical conductivity than that of the pure solvent. An acidic solution formed by acid salt is made during partial neutralization of diprotic or polyprotic acids. A half-neutralization occurs due to the remaining of replaceable hydrogen atoms from the partial dissociation of weak acids that have not been reacted with hydroxide ions to create water molecules.

Acidic solution and examples of acid salts

Acid-base property of the resulting solution from a neutralization reaction depends on the remaining salt products. A salt containing reactive cations undergo hydrolysis by which they react with water molecules, causing deprotonation of the conjugate acids.

For example, the acid salt ammonium chloride is the main species formed upon the half neutralization of ammonia in hydrochloric acid solution:
NH3_{(aq)}\ +\ HCl_{(aq)} -> NH4Cl_{(aq)}

Use in food
Acidic salts are often used in foods as part of leavening agents. In this context, the acid salts are referred to as "leavening acids." Common leavening acids include cream of tartar and monocalcium phosphate.

An acidic salt can be mixed with an alkali salt (such as sodium bicarbonate or baking soda) to create baking powders which release carbon dioxide. Leavening agents can be slow-acting (e.g. sodium aluminum phosphate) which react when heated, or fast-acting (e,g, cream of tartar) which react immediately at low temperatures. Double-acting baking powders contain both slow- and fast-acting leavening agents and react at low and high temperatures to provide leavening rising throughout the baking process.

Disodium phosphate, is used in foods and monosodium phosphate, is used in animal feed, toothpaste and evaporated milk.

Intensity of acid
An acid with higher  value dominates the chemical reaction. It serves as a better contributor of protons.

 The solution is acidic if . It contains a greater concentration of  ions than concentration of  ions due more extensive of cation hydrolysis compared to that of anion hydrolysis.
 The solution is alkali if . Anions hydrolyze more than cations, causing an exceeding concentration of  ions.
 The solution is expected to be neutral only when .

Other possible factors that could vary pH level of a solution are the relevant equilibrium constants and the additional amounts of any base or acid.

For example, in ammonium chloride solution,  is the main influence for acidic solution.

Hydrolysis of ammonium at room temperature produces:
NH4+_{(aq)}\ + H2O_{(aq)} <=> NH3_{(aq)}\ + H3O+_{(aq)}

See also
Alkali salt
Salt (chemistry)
Oxoacid
Sodium bicarbonate
Sodium bisulfate
Disodium phosphate
Monosodium phosphate

References

Salts
Acids